Owksar-e Karim Kola (also Romanized as Owksar-e Karīm Kolā; also known as Owksar) is a village in Emamzadeh Abdollah Rural District, Dehferi District, Fereydunkenar County, Mazandaran Province, Iran. At the 2006 census, its population was 329, in 88 families.

References 

Populated places in Fereydunkenar County